DXTV-TV, channel 13, is a commercial television station owned by Intercontinental Broadcasting Corporation. The station's transmitter is located at Broadcast Ave., Shrine Hills, Matina, Davao City.

Recently, it just went back on the air after a few months of inactivity through Cignal's feed (basically relay from Manila's flagship station).

This station is currently operating on a 400-watt low powered signal.

IBC 13 Davao previously aired programs
Davao Express Balita (2002-2003)

Area of coverage
 Davao City
 Davao del Sur

See also 
 List of Intercontinental Broadcasting Corporation channels and stations

Television channels and stations established in 1962
Television stations in Davao City
Intercontinental Broadcasting Corporation stations